Brice Benjamin Hudgins (August 15, 1854 – December 1, 1923) was an American politician. He was a member of the Arkansas House of Representatives, serving from 1887 to 1893, and was Speaker of the House in his last term. He was a member of the Democratic party.

He served as a circuit court judge from 1890 to 1898 and from 1908 to 1912. He was also chairman of the Arkansas Railroad Commission from 1903 to 1907.

B. B. Hudgins died in December 1923.

References

1923 deaths
Speakers of the Arkansas House of Representatives
Democratic Party members of the Arkansas House of Representatives
1854 births
People from Taney County, Missouri
People from Boone County, Arkansas
19th-century American politicians